Guru (or Garuda, Garoda) is a community from Rajasthan and Gujarat who functioned as priests of Scheduled Castes but do not fall under the category of scheduled castes themselves.They are called guru as they are religious teacher.

References

Scheduled Castes
Social groups of Gujarat
Social groups of Rajasthan
Priestly castes